Frenchtown Township may refer to the following places in the United States:

 Frenchtown Charter Township, Michigan
 Frenchtown Township, Antelope County, Nebraska

Township name disambiguation pages